Franz Roubaud (June 15, 1856 - March 13, 1928) was a Russian painter who created some of the largest and best known panoramic paintings. He created circular paintings, exposed on a cylindrical surface and viewed from the inside at a lookout point. The painting was believed to reproduce the original scene with high fidelity.

Biography 

Franz (François) Roubaud was born on 3/15 June 1856 in Odessa to Honoré Fortuné Alexis Roubaud and his wife Madelaine (née Sénèque). Franz was the fourth of five children in a Catholic family; his father was a  bookseller and stationer, originally from Marseille. He studied at the Odessa Drawing School. In 1877 Roubaud went to Munich and studied at the Munich Academy of Fine Arts.

He then settled in Saint Petersburg, working in the Imperial Academy of Arts and painting huge panoramas of historical battles. In 1904-12 Roubaud taught at the St. Petersburg Academy of Arts as a professor. During this time he painted the Siege of Sevastopol, a panoramic painting. In the mid-19th century, the various panoramic paintings became a fashionable way to depict landscapes and historical events. The panorama was a 360-degree visual medium patented by the artist Robert Barker in 1787. This was a new thing for the time and for the audiences in Europe of this period these paintings were a sensation. The paintings created a new illusion, transporting the viewer into a virtual reality, creating the perception of being physically present in the middle of the events. When standing in the middle of the 360 degree panorama  this created the impression of standing in a new environment.

He became renowned thanks to the giant panoramic paintings he executed during his lifetime. Roubaud's works were so large that they required specially built pavilions to exhibit them. These paintings are one of the few panoramas still extant of a popular 19th-century genre. The viewer stands in the centre of the circular panorama, and observes the various scenes whilst walking around and observing the panorama from different viewing angles.

In 1913 Roubaud left Russia for Germany, settling in Munich. After the outbreak of World War I, the German authorities recognized him as a French citizen, but did not intern him, and on December 19, 1914, they granted him German citizenship. He lived in Munich for the rest of his life and died on 13 March 1928.

Works

List of works 

 Russo-Persian War (1804–1813) - unveiled 1892
 Storm of Achulgo – unveiled 1896, 3 fragments remain in the Dagestan museum of fine arts in Makhachkala, Daghestan
 Siege of Sevastopol (1854) – unveiled in 1905, damaged during the Siege of Sevastopol (1942), restored 1950s
 Battle of Borodino (1812) – unveiled 1911, moved to Poklonnaya Hill in Moscow in 1962

Sevastopol Panorama
The Sevastopol Panorama is a giant painting depicting the siege of Sevastopol of 1854–55. The painting was exhibited in a rotunda, a special building constructed in a circular shape. The size of the painting is enormous,  but it was a necessity for the realistic depiction of military scenes because of the huge number of participants and the wide sweep of the scenery. Roubaud worked on this painting for almost three years, starting in 1901. He researched the historical events by traveling to Sevastopol, reading about the battle itself as well as by reading historical documents that described the different scenes and incidents during the war. He also talked to surviving participants. Roubaud made his first sketches in Saint Petersburg. He kept working on the painting later at the Bavarian Academy of Fine Arts where he decided to use a canvas 14 m high by 115 m long. When he finished the painting, it was displayed in Sevastopol in the summer of 1904, on the fiftieth anniversary of the defence of the city.

Battle of Borodino Panorama

Other works

References

External links 
Genealogy Franz Roubaud

1856 births
1928 deaths
19th-century painters from the Russian Empire
Russian male painters
20th-century Russian painters
Russian people of French descent
Painters from Saint Petersburg
Russian war artists
Academy of Fine Arts, Munich alumni
Artists from Odesa
19th-century war artists
19th-century male artists from the Russian Empire
20th-century Russian male artists